IVECO, an acronym for Industrial Vehicles Corporation, is an Italian multinational transport vehicle manufacturing company. It designs and builds light, medium, and heavy commercial vehicles. The name IVECO first appeared in 1975 after a merger of Italian, French, and German brands. Its production plants are in Europe, China, Russia, Australia and Latin America and it has about 5,000 sales and service outlets in over 160 countries. The worldwide output of the company amounts to around 150,000 commercial vehicles with a turnover of about 10 billion. 

The company was spun-off from CNH Industrial on 1 January 2022. It is subsidiary of Iveco Group N.V., a holding company incorporated in Amsterdam, Netherlands, and is listed on Borsa Italiana.

History 
IVECO was incorporated on 1 January 1975, with the merger of five different brands: FIAT Veicoli Industriali (with headquarters in Turin), OM (Brescia, Italy), Lancia Veicoli Speciali (Italy), Unic (France), and Magirus-Deutz (Germany).

Following the merger, the newly founded IVECO began rationalizing its product range, manufacturing plants, and sales network, while keeping the original brands. From 1975 to 1979, the IVECO range included 200 basic models and 600 versions spanning from 2.7 tons of GVW for a light vehicle to over 40 tons for heavy vehicles, as well as buses and engines. In 1977, the light- to medium-weight IVECO Zeta range was introduced, replacing the 20-year-old OM Lupetto. Integrating the FIAT-OM range with the Unic and Magirus lineups was completed by 1980. IVECO moved in to work on increasing productivity and engine development. In 1978, IVECO launched the first product in the range of IVECO-branded light vehicles, the Daily.

In 1980, IVECO built a turbo diesel engine for heavy industrial vehicles. In this decade the corporate strategy was heavily oriented towards brand promotion and led to the sponsorship of sports events, such as the 1980 Olympic Games in Moscow, the Davis Cup in 1982, multiple championship boxing matches, the Jacques Cousteau expeditions in the Amazon basin in 1983 and the Raid Pigafetta, during which the IVECO-FIAT 75 PC 4x4 was first to make a full circle of the globe. Two new divisions were also formed: bus diesel engines and firefighting vehicles.

In 1984, IVECO launched the TurboStar, a heavy on-road vehicle that became a best-seller in Italy and also successful in the European market, selling a total of 50,000 in seven years.

In 1985, IVECO made the first light diesel engine with direct injection.

From 1986, IVECO S.p.A. held a 52% stake in Iveco Ford Truck Ltd, a joint venture (and effectively a merger) with Ford of Europe's truck division. Ford plants took over production and sales of the major vehicles in the IVECO range and continued production of the Ford Cargo. In the mid-1980s, Astra Veicoli Industriali, which produces dumpers and construction site/quarry vehicles in Piacenza, became part of Iveco Group.

In 1989, the first diesel engine with EGR to reduce polluting emissions compatible with commercial vehicles was produced, and the new Daily launched that same year was fitted with it.

In 1990, the group purchased 60% control of Spanish industrial company ENASA, which owned the industrial vehicle builder Pegaso. In the 1990s, the EuroCargo, EuroTech, EuroTrakker, and EuroStar vehicles represented a total facelift for the range. The EuroCargo and the EuroTech were named "Truck of the Year" in 1992 and 1993, respectively, and for the first time, this recognition was awarded to the same manufacturer for two years in a row. English company Seddon Atkinson was purchased in 1991 and brought its long heritage of special vehicles for the construction and refuse-collection industries. That same year, the first TurboDaily assembly line was inaugurated at the Nanjing Motor Corporation in China. In 1991, IVECO announced that they were withdrawing from the North American market at the end of the calendar year; they had been selling the midrange Iveco Euro there since 1978.

In 1992, IVECO took over the primary constructor of industrial vehicles in Australia to form Ital, originally called International Trucks Australia. In 2000 it was renamed Iveco Trucks Australia Limited. In 1996 firefighting activities in Germany were structured under the company IVECO Magirus Brandschutztechnik GmbH. The following year, these activities were boosted by the arrival of an Austrian company, Löhr, which then became Löhr Magirus.

In 1998, the Cursor 8 was launched, followed the next year by the Cursor 10, the first diesel engine with a variable-geometry turbine and the first common-rail diesel engine for heavy industrial vehicles. The 125th anniversary of the presentation of the first Magirus ladder was celebrated together with the delivery of the 5000th Magirus aerial ladder produced since the Second World War.

In 2003, IVECO entirely bought out Irisbus, originally part of a joint venture with Renault. In 2004, the IVECO Motors brand was introduced, which became an umbrella for the production of engines; the following year, it was incorporated into the newly founded Fiat Powertrain Technologies. At the end of 2004, an agreement was reached between Iveco and the Chinese company Shanghai Automotive Industry Corporation (SAIC).

In 2006, Iveco sponsored the Winter Olympic Games in Turin with a fleet of 1,200 Irisbus buses. The year after, IVECO became sponsor of the All Blacks, New Zealand's rugby team. In 2009, IVECO became the truck and commercial vehicle supplier for the Moto GP, together with the historical sponsorship to the Ferrari Racing Team, for which it supplies the vehicles that transport the single-seaters at all the Formula 1 World Championship races.

On 1 January 2011, Fiat Industrial was formed, incorporating CNH, IVECO, and FPT Industrial. In September of the same year, the Fiat Industrial Village was inaugurated in Turin, a multipurpose centre belonging to Fiat Industrial and created for the sales, assistance, and product presentation for the IVECO, New Holland, and FPT Industrial brands.
On 15 January 2012, IVECO won the 33rd edition of the Dakar Rally with the Petronas De Rooy team and Dutch driver Gerard De Rooy, behind the wheel of an IVECO Powerstar. De Rooy was followed by drivers Stacey and Biasion behind the wheel of two Iveco Trakker Evolution 2 vehicles, equipped with an FPT Industrial C13 engine with over 900 hp.

On 11 November 2021, Iveco published the prospectus in order to split from CNH Industrial which will be operated as a publicly separated company named Iveco Group N.V. After the completion of the demerger, on 1 January 2022 IVECO became a part of Iveco Group N.V., the parent company of the trucks and specialty vehicles, powertrain and related financial services businesses previously held by CNH Industrial.

Facilities
IVECO has 27 production plants and 6 research centres located in 16 countries. Outside of Europe, the company operates in China, Russia, Australia (Factory ceased production in June 2022), South Africa and Latin America. All the plants have obtained ISO 9001-vision 2000 (quality management by process) and ISO 14000 (environmental management) certification.

Joint-ventures 
 Naveco (Nanjing, China), production trucks by Naveco brand
 SAIC-Iveco Hongyan (Chongqing, China), production trucks by Hongyan brand

Emissions and alternative fuels

Euro VI engines with SCR technology
IVECO engines from the Cursor and Tector ranges observe the Euro VI standards by adopting High Efficiency SCR (HI-eSCR) technology. This technology optimises the processes of exhaust combustion and after-treatment, reducing consumption and enabling achievement of greater efficiency in the conversion of NOx emissions.

Electric drive
IVECO developed and built the first Daily with electric propulsion in 1986; Later, the range was broadened to include trucks and city buses. IVECO introduced the New Daily with electric propulsion and zero exhaust emissions, in which a battery system powers an electric three-phase asynchronous motor – through the aid of an inverter – in charge of moving the vehicle directly, while recovering energy during braking.
The vehicle runs on two to four batteries made with Na/NiCl2 (Sodium-nickel chlorine) technology at a nominal 278 Volts. The maximum velocity is electronically limited to 70km/h, while the vehicle's range is from 90 to 130km on a fully charged battery, depending on the number of batteries and the mission.

Diesel-electric parallel hybrid traction
The parallel hybrid solution incorporates both a Diesel engine and an electric engine that can be used individually or simultaneously, which makes for greater operating flexibility and allows the vehicle to work under both urban and non-urban conditions.
In 2010 IVECO introduced this technology on the Eurocargo Ibrido, a commercial vehicle for the European market with electri-diesel parallel propulsion for distributing and collecting goods in city centres. The payload capacity decreases by 200kg in comparison to diesel-engine models, but it is possible to save up to 30% on the urban cycle. 
The Eurocargo hybrid range is made up of two versions:
 the 7.5-ton version uses a Tector Diesel FPT Industrial engine with 16 valves and 4 Euro V cylinders, with a maximum power of 160hp (118 kW); this is paired with a drive system made of an electric motor-generator with 60hp (44kW), a 6-speed automated gearbox and a lithium ion battery pack (Li-Ion) of rated capacity 1.8kWh.
 The 12-ton version uses the FPT Industrial Tector engine with 16 valves and 4 EEV cylinders with a maximum power of 180hp (132kW), paired with an electric motor-generator with 60hp (44kW), a 6-speed automated gear box and a lithium ion battery pack (Li-Ion) of rated capacity 1.8kWh.

Diesel-electric hybrid
IVECO has been active in this sector since 1990 with 6, 7, 4 and 12 meters buses for urban and suburban transportation. The series hybrid technology features a diesel engine – smaller than that of a traditional vehicle – that acts as a battery charger.

CNG – compressed natural gas
IVECO's range of light, medium and heavy vehicles and buses can run on methane. 
Methane makes it possible to save on consumption by 38% per kg transported as compared to that consumed by diesel engines for the same payload and distance travelled. In addition, compared to EuroVI diesel engines, methane engines reduce NOx emissions by approximately 60% and particulates emissions by approximately 70%.

LNG – liquefied natural gas
In April 2012 IVECO presented its first vehicle with this technology, the Stralis LNG.
As opposed to vehicles with CNG technology, LNG technology takes the vehicle farther on a full tank (up to 750km) and reduces the vehicle's tare thus increasing the load. The main difference between the two technologies lies in the type of natural gas storage employed, which in this case is kept in a liquid state at −161°C in cryogenic tanks; it is then heated in a heat exchanger so that once it reaches the engine it is a gas. Also, the noise emitted decreases by 3 to 6 decibels over an analogous diesel engine vehicle.

IVECO Trakker Bifuel – diesel-ethanol prototype
IVECO created the first prototype of a bifuel, diesel and ethanol-run vehicle. The technology was developed by IVECO together with FPT Industrial and Bosch. The prototype uses a Trakker truck with Common Rail Cursor9 engine with 360HP that may be powered by a 40–60% ethanol-diesel blend. The prototype was tested by Raízen, a joint venture between the cane sugar producer Cosan and Shell. 
In 2011, this prototype earned IVECO the "Prêmio Top Etanol" – for the alternative fuel technology.

Heating and air-conditioning systems
A prototype of a heat pump system for electric and hybrid vehicles was installed on the IVECO Daily vehicle. The system cools or heats the passenger compartment by transferring low temperature heat generated by the drive systems. At the same time, the control strategies minimise the energy demand in order to achieve a low impact on consumption.

IVECO vehicles
The brand’s range of products include the Daily, a vehicle that covers the 3.3 – 7.2 ton vehicle weight segment, the Eurocargo from 6 – 19 tons and, in the heavy segment above 16 tons, the IVECO Way range with the on-road IVECO S-Way, the off-road IVECO T-Way and the IVECO X-Way for light off-road missions.

Current models
	
 Acco 
 Daily 
 eDaily
 EuroCargo 
 Eurofire 
 GFF4 
 LMV 
 Metro
 NJ-series 
 Ouba 
 S-Way 
 Trakker 
 Traveler 
 Turbo Daily 
 VM 90

Former models
	
 Campagnola
 CityClass
 Effeuno 
 EuroClass
 EuroMover 
 EuroRider 
 EuroStar 
 EuroTech 
 EuroTrakker 
 Massif 
 MyWay
 PowerStar
 Stralis 
 T-series
 TurboCity
 TurboStar
 X-series
 Zeta

Major sponsorships
Iveco has in the past sponsored many major professional boxing events, including, in each case, the first of two fights between Sugar Ray Leonard and Tommy Hearns and between Aaron Pryor and Alexis Arguello.

Gallery

See also 
 IVECO Bus
 International Association of Public Transport
 List of Italian companies
 Sofim

References

External links

 
 FPT (previously Iveco Motors)

 
Battery electric vehicles
Corporate spin-offs
Vehicle manufacturing companies established in 1975
Italian companies established in 1975
Defence companies of Italy
Electric bus manufacturers
Electric vehicle manufacturers of Italy
Emergency services equipment makers
Italian brands
Bus manufacturers of Italy
Truck manufacturers of Italy
Turin motor companies
Multinational companies headquartered in Italy
2022 initial public offerings